Juan Simons Vela Airport  is an airport serving Rioja, San Martín Region, Perú.

Airlines and Destinations

See also
Transport in Peru
List of airports in Peru

References

External links
Airports infrastructurePeruvian Ministry of Infrastructure and Communications 
OpenStreetMap - Rioja

OurAirports - Rioja

Airports in Peru
Buildings and structures in San Martín Region